Susan Booth-Forbes (formerly Paxman, née Larson), is an American-Irish teacher, writer and literary editor. She was a co-founder of the progressive Mormon women's journal Exponent II, from 1974, and its longest-serving editor, from 1984 to 1997, and involved in its long-running program of retreats.  She has operated the Anam Cara Writer's and Artist's Retreat in West Cork, Ireland, for over twenty years, hosting and supporting more than 1,000 writers and other creative artists.  Before her editorial career, while a high school English teacher, she was one of two plaintiffs in a successful legal action over discrimination against female staff by her employer when she was pregnant in 1971, winning a declaration of unconstitutionality in US Federal court.

Life

Early life
Susan Larson was born to Clinton F. (1919-1994) and Naomi Larson (née Barlow) (1923-2010) of Provo, Utah, U.S.; her grandfather was the athlete Clinton Larson.  Her father was an academic at Brigham Young University and a poet and playwright; he was the university's poet-in-residence for many years. She has one sister, Diane Larson Porter, a pianist, writer, and retired hospice nurse. The family were active Mormons, members of the Church of Jesus Christ of Latter-day Saints.

Early career

Virginia
Larson studied at Brigham Young University (BYU), qualifying with a degree in English and Political Science, and with a Secondary Teaching Certificate.

She started her teaching career, in Utah, in 1966, in December of which year she also married John Monroe Paxman, at the Salt Lake City Temple. The couple moved to Charlottesville, Virginia in 1969, after John Paxman became a student at the University of Virginia School of Law.  She held teaching posts in local schools.  After being denied a routine renewal of contract as an English teacher at Albemarle High School in summer 1971 due to a pregnancy with a due date in December, she, as the family's main breadwinner, had to find new work.  She took a job as an office manager of a research lab at the University of Virginia Medical School, working up to her last week of pregnancy and returning one month later.

The Paxman-Gough constitutional case
Paxman, who stated that she had been surprised by the restrictive Virginia maternity rules, as those in Utah had been more flexible, and shocked when the county school board upheld the initial decision, became one of two plaintiffs in a lawsuit challenging rules across Virginia around employment discrimination due to pregnancy, winning a declaration of the unconstitutionality of such rules in 1975, and damages to include lost pay, but, on appeal, concluded in 1980, losing recompense other than an entitlement to reinstatement and partial cover for legal fees.  While originally certified as a class action potentially including all pregnant teachers in the state, it was later decertified, but after an early ruling in the case, in 1972 the discriminatory rules were dismantled statewide anyway.

Massachusetts
The Paxmans moved to and lived for an extended period in the greater Boston area, including in Cambridge, Massachusetts.

Exponent II
Paxman was a member of the team producing Exponent II, a magazine by, and largely for, Mormon women, from its inception, and on the masthead from the second issue, in October 1974. She remained heavily involved until 1997, and in some form after, even to the present. She served as its fourth Editor from spring 1984 until 1997, as Susan L. or Sue Paxman until 1996, then as Sue Booth-Forbes.  The magazine addressed a wide range of issues, including feminism, reproductive rights, peace campaigns and other aspects of the roles and potential of women.

Eliza Dushku
Along with several family members, Paxman served as on-set guardian (a Screen Actors Guild-mandated role) for actress Eliza Dushku, from her first serious film performance (This Boy's Life) - her mother, Judy Rasmussen Dushku, a fellow Mormon from the same region and a friend, was also on the Exponent II team.  In 1993 she was present for three weeks in this role during filming of True Lies, and she backed Eliza Dushku when she, many years later, alleged an off-set sexual assault by a member of the production team - which Dushku at the time reported only to her mother, a brother, and a different family friend - and commented on the overall industry situation at that time.

Other work
When living in England, Booth-Forbes also worked for the Cambridge University Press.  Just prior to moving to Ireland, she worked as communications director for a quasi-public agency in Boston.

Ireland
With a divorce, after over 30 years, due to finalise in November 1997, and looking for a new direction, and having led multiple retreats linked to Exponent II, Booth-Forbes joined in a month-long literary retreat with friends, including Mary Lythgoe Bradford, in Connemara in August 1997, In December 1997 she searched with her daughter and purchased a property near the small village of Eyeries in West Cork, on the Beara Peninsula, launching a residential creative retreat, Anam Cara Writer's and Artist's Retreat, in June 1998.  Over twenty-one years, more than 1,000 creative guests - writers, composers, choreographers, visual artists - have been on retreat, leaving more than 500 books on the shelves and paintings on the walls in the common areas of the retreat.  The retreat itself is at the centre of a multi-acre space with more than thirty private working nooks and crannies, some on the landscaped riverbank.  Booth-Forbes describes her work with some guests as that of a "literary midwife" and also says that the retreat format is partly modeled on the way her mother looked after her poet father. Several guests have dedicated work to Anam Cara and to her.

Aside from her work as director of the Anam Cara Retreat, Booth-Forbes remains active in local fundraising and creative activities  as well as promotion and news-gathering for the local area.

In 2018, Booth-Forbes launched a publishing company, Anam Cara Publishing.  As of December 2020, the company has published six titles.

Personal life
Booth-Forbes has two children, three grandchildren, and five nephews and nieces. She became an Irish citizen in 2012.

References

People from Provo, Utah
American Latter Day Saint writers
American magazine editors
American women editors
Women magazine editors
Editors of Latter Day Saint publications
People from County Cork
Irish editors
Irish women editors
Living people
Year of birth missing (living people)
Brigham Young University alumni